Paul Finet (4 November 1897 – 18 May 1965) was a Belgian politician and former General Secretary of FGTB. He served in the High Authority of the European Coal and Steel Community from 1952 on, chairing it in 1958. From 1958 to 1959, he then headed the Finet Authority.

References

1897 births
1965 deaths
Belgian European Commissioners
Belgian trade unionists
Politicians from Charleroi
Members of the High Authority of the European Coal and Steel Community